Calonectris is a genus of seabirds. The genus name comes from Ancient Greek kalos, "good" and nectris, "swimmer".

The genus comprises four large shearwaters.  There are two other shearwater genera. Puffinus, which comprises about twenty small to medium-sized shearwaters, and  Procellaria with another four large species. The latter are usually named as petrels, although they are thought to be more closely related to the shearwaters than to the other petrels.

The species in this group are long-winged birds, dark brown or grey-brown above, and mainly white below. They are pelagic outside the breeding season. They are most common in temperate and cold waters.

These tubenose birds fly with stiff wings, and use a shearing flight technique to move across wave fronts with the minimum of active flight. Their flight appears more albatross-like than the Puffinus species.

Calonectris shearwaters are long-distance migrants. The streaked shearwater disperses from its east Asian breeding islands throughout the western Pacific and into the eastern Indian Ocean. They come to islands and coastal cliffs only to breed. They are nocturnal at the colonial breeding sites, preferring moonless nights to minimise predation. They nest in burrows and often give eerie contact calls on their night time visits. They lay a single white egg. They feed on fish, squid and similar oceanic food. They will follow fishing boats to take scraps.

Taxonomy
The genus Calonectris was introduced in 1915 by the ornithologists Gregory Mathews and Tom Iredale with the streaked shearwater as the type species. The genus name combines the Ancient Greek kalos meaning "good" or "noble" with the genus name Nectris that was used for shearwaters by the German naturalist Heinrich Kuhl in 1820. The name Nectris comes from the Ancient Greek nēktris meaning "swimmer".

Scopoli's shearwater and Cory's shearwater were previously considered as conspecific and formed the Cory's shearwater complex (Calonectris diomedea). Based on the lack of hybridization and differences in mitochondrial DNA, morphology and vocalization, the complex was split into two separate species. The English name "Cory's shearwater" was transferred to Calonectris borealis while what was previously the nominate subspecies became Scopoli's shearwater (Calonectris diomedea).

Species
The genus contains four species.

Extinct species, Calonectris krantzi from the Early Pliocene and Calonectris wingatei from the Middle Pleistocene, have also been described from fossils. Calonectris kurodai, another fossil from the Middle Miocene Calvert Formation of Chesapeake Bay is named after the Japanese ornithologist Nagahisa Kuroda.

Phylogeny
Phylogeny based on a study by Joan Ferrer Obiol and collaborators published in 2022.

References

Further reading
Harrison, Peter (1987): Seabirds of the World: A Photographic Guide. Princeton University Press, Princeton. 
Heidrich, Petra; Amengual, José F. & Wink, Michael (1998): Phylogenetic relationships in Mediterranean and North Atlantic shearwaters (Aves: Procellariidae) based on nucleotide sequences of mtDNA. Biochemical Systematics and Ecology 26(2): 145–170.  PDF fulltext

 

Bird genera
Taxa named by Gregory Mathews
Taxa named by Tom Iredale